Baghdaniyeh (also Romanized as Baghdānīyeh; also known as Baghdānī) is a village in Howmeh Rural District, in the Central District of Iranshahr County, Sistan and Baluchestan Province, Iran. At the 2006 census, its population was 817, in 165 families.

References 

Populated places in Iranshahr County